Pallall Qullu (Aymara pallalla flat, qullu mountain, "flat mountain", also spelled Pallall Kkollu) is a  mountain in the Andes of Bolivia. It is located in the Oruro Department, Mejillones Province, Carangas Municipality, and in the Sabaya Province, Sabaya Municipality.

References 

Mountains of Oruro Department